Pavlof Bay is an inlet in Alaska located on the southwestern edge of the Alaska Peninsula. It is on the peninsula's south coast, is about 50 miles (80 kilometers) long, and lies directly north of the Pavlof Islands. The 8,261-foot (2,518-meter) volcano Mount Pavlof is on its western shore.

Notes

References
Merriam-Webster's Geographical Dictionary, Third Edition. Springfield, Massachusetts: Merriam-Webster, Incorporated, 1997. .

Bays of Alaska
Bodies of water of Aleutians East Borough, Alaska